Palazzo Magnani can refer to several buildings in Italy:

Palazzo Magnani, Bologna, also referred to as Palazzo Magnani Salem
Palazzo Magnani Feroni, Florence
Palazzo Magnani, Reggio Emilia, also referred to as Palazzo Becchi Magnani